Vista Canyon Multi-Modal Center, also known as the Vista Canyon Regional Transit Center, is a Metrolink infill station and transport hub under construction in the Canyon Country borough of Santa Clarita, California. It is located along Metrolink's Antelope Valley Line.

Overview
Built as part of the adjacent Canyon Valley transit-oriented development, the development will feature a Metrolink rail infill station along the Antelope Valley Line, a bus transfer facility, and a 613-space parking garage. The hub is partly funded by a special tax district of adjacent properties, and by grants from Caltrans. The contract awarded for construction of the train station was valued at $23.7 million. City of Santa Clarita Transit is aiming to begin serving the facility in 2023.

History
Initial planning for the transit center began in April 2010 and was completed in November 2012. NEPA environmental approval was obtained in June 2014. Pre-construction of the transit center began in September 2016, with construction expected to begin in November. However, a series of administrative issues delayed initial construction to 2020.

On October 22, 2019, the Santa Clarita City Council unanimously approved a $1 million construction contract with RailPros to build out the Metrolink station at Vista Canyon.

Construction of the station led by Icon West, Inc. began in January 2020. A groundbreaking for the rail station was held the same day as the opening of the parking facility: October 27, 2020. At that time, the station was expected to open in 2022.

See also
McBean Regional Transit Center

References

External links
 Vista Canyon Metrolink Station Project — California Environmental Quality Act assessment site
 Vista Canyon Regional Transit Center — project website

Santa Clarita, California
Future Metrolink (California) stations
Railway stations scheduled to open in 2023